My Diary is a compilation album by American R&B singer R. Kelly.

Track listing
 "Intro/In the Kitchen" (Remix)
 "How Many"
 "Hypnotic" (featuring. Syleena Johnson & Fabolous)
 "So Sexy (Pt.II)" (featuring. Twista)
 "Trapped in the Closet Chapter 1"
 "In the Kitchen (Interlude)"
 "In the Kitchen"
 "Baby I Love U!" (featuring. Jennifer Lopez)
 "Africa"
 "Spirit"
 "Pick Up the Phone" (featuring. Tyrese Gibson & Ludacris)
 "Leap of Faith"
 "U Saved Me" (Live version)
 "Laundromat" (featuring. Nivea)
 "Soldier's Heart"
 "Step in the Name of Love" (Live version)

References

External links
My Diary by R. Kelly : Reviews and Ratings - Rate Your Music

2005 compilation albums
R. Kelly albums